The 1876–77 season was the sixth season of competitive football by Queen's Park. This was the first season that Queen's entered both the Scottish Cup and the FA Cup.

Scottish Cup

For the first time, Queen's Park lost a Scottish Cup tie when they were beaten by eventual champions Vale of Leven in the quarter-finals.

FA Cup

Queen's Park entered the FA Cup for the first time since 1872–73. They received a bye through rounds one and two but they withdrew before their round match with Oxford University.

Glasgow Merchants' Charity Cup
For the first edition of the end-of-season Glasgow Merchants' Charity Cup, Queen's Park were due to face Vale of Leven in the final. However, the Scottish Cup tie between the teams earlier in the season had ended in controversy as Queen's accused Vale of wearing illegal spikes on their boots. It was hoped the charity cup could be used to heal relations between the clubs but Vale refused to play and were replaced by Rangers.

Friendlies

References

1876–77
Queen's Park
1876–77 in Scottish football